Haj Ali Soua, was born in Ksar Hellal in 1870 and died in 1953, is a Tunisian trader and philanthropist.

Biography
Born in Ksar Hellal in 1870 and by having lost his father in a young age, Haj Ali Soua has to face the difficulties of life by doing odd jobs in agriculture and textiles, before specializing in the cotton trade which allowed him to amass a small fortune.

Haj Ali Soua is best known for his philanthropic works, including:

 The construction and financing of a primary school in 1929 which today bears his name: The Haj Ali Soua Primary School
 the construction and financing of a local hospital, which has now become regional, and which also bears his name: The Haj Ali Soua Regional Hospital

A street in Ksar Hellal today bears his name.

References

External links

Tunisian philanthropists
1870 births
1953 deaths